Mezzolombardo (local dialect: Mezombart) is a comune (municipality) in Trentino in the northern Italian region Trentino-Alto Adige/Südtirol, located about  north of the city of Trento.

Mezzolombardo borders the following municipalities: Ton, Mezzocorona, Spormaggiore, San Michele all'Adige, Fai della Paganella, Nave San Rocco, and Zambana.

Demographic evolution

References

External links
  Homepage of the city

Cities and towns in Trentino-Alto Adige/Südtirol